Edward Matthews  (1904 or 1905 – 20 February 1954) was a pioneering African-American baritone opera singer.

Matthews was born in Ossining, New York State. In 1934, he created the role of Ignatius of Loyola in Virgil Thomson's Four Saints in Three Acts, which he reprised in the 1952 revival of the opera – his last appearance on Broadway. In 1935, he created his most famous role, Jake the fisherman, in the original 1935 production of George Gershwin's Porgy and Bess. Here, Matthews introduced the song "A Woman Is a Sometime Thing". He recreated the role in the 1942 revival of the opera, and in the 1951 three-LP album set – the most complete recording of Porgy and Bess made up to that time.

Matthews died in a car crash on 20 February 1954, aged 49, near Woodbridge, Virginia.

References

Eileen Southern, The Music of Black Americans: A History. W. W. Norton & Company; 3rd edition.

External links
, studio rehearsal recording, 1935

20th-century African-American male singers
20th-century American male opera singers
African-American male opera singers
American operatic baritones
1900s births
1954 deaths
People from Ossining, New York